Trioceros kinetensis , the Mount Kineti chameleon, is a species of chameleon found in South Sudan.

References

Trioceros
Reptiles described in 1943
Taxa named by Karl Patterson Schmidt
Reptiles of South Sudan